The term neurosis refers to mental disorders that involve neither hallucinations or delusions.

Neurosis may also refer to:

Neurosis (band)
"Neurosis", a song by Bitter:Sweet from the album Drama

See also